Thomas Fischer may refer to:

 Thomas Fischer (actor), cast member of the 1970 German film Hotel by the Hour
 Thomas Fischer (basketball), played on Germany's team in the 2004 Summer Paralympics
 Thomas Fischer (footballer), played for 1. FC Union Berlin 1989–1990
 Thomas Fischer (judge), judge in the Federal Court of Justice in Germany, retired
 Thomas Fischer (IMSAI), American businessman
 Thomas Fischer (skier) (born 1986), German skier
 Thomas Gabriel Fischer (born 1963), Swiss heavy-metal musician

See also
 Steven Thomas Fischer (born 1972), American film director, producer, and cartoonist
 Tom and Maureen Fischer, founders of Little Mary's Hospitality House
 Thomas Fisher (disambiguation)